Kodi guddu pulusu is a dish in Telangana. Kodi guddu means "the egg" and pulusu  implies a spicy tamarind sauce. As a result, this dish usually consists of boiled eggs cooked in a tangy tamarind sauce combined with spices.

References

Telangana cuisine
Indian egg dishes